Midlothian High School  is one of ten secondary schools in the Midlothian section of unincorporated Chesterfield County, Virginia, United States. Midlothian is a part of Chesterfield County Public Schools.

History
The original Midlothian High School was located on Route 60 (Midlothian Turnpike) in the village of Midlothian 14.1 miles west of Richmond, Virginia. The high school became accredited in 1924, graduating 3 students that year.  A new high school located at 401 Charter Colony Parkway opened for the 1984–85 school year, leaving the original Midlothian High School to become Midlothian Middle School.

Academics
Midlothian High School offers, Advanced Placement (AP) courses, Dual Enrollment (DE) courses from Brightpoint Community College, and International Baccalaureate (IB) courses to its students.

The International Baccalaureate (IB) Program has been a specialty center at Midlothian High School since 2001. This program is one of the fourteen specialty centers in Chesterfield County. If accepted into the program, students are placed in honors/AP classes during their freshman and sophomore years in preparation for the more rigorous IB classes they will take in their junior and senior years. 

IB Courses Offered: IB Math Applications and Interpretation 1 and 2, IB History of the Americas, IB Government/Twentieth Century Topics, IB English Language and Literature 11 and 12, IB Biology 1 and 2, IB Spanish, French, Latin, Theory of Knowledge, IB Psychology, IB Business Management, IB Sports, Exercise, and Health Science, IB Visual Arts, IB Theatre, and IB Music.

Controversies
In 2017, parents of students at Midlothian High School received an email from the principal after an "inappropriate image" was shown during a presentation. Principal Shawn A. Abel said in the email that while the school was hosting a program presentation for sophomore students, the presenter, a Bon Secours x-ray technician, had pornographic images appear on screen during the presentation.

In 2019, Dina Persico, a former teacher at Providence Middle School and Midlothian High School, raised a lawsuit against Midlothian High School for discrimination against her sexuality and diagnosed Asperger’s syndrome and autism spectrum disorder. The suite was settled for $10,000.

Notable alumni
Weegie Thompson – 1979 graduate, Pittsburgh Steelers wide receiver
 Richard Kelly – 1993 graduate, director and writer of Donnie Darko.
 John Donley Adams – 1992 graduate, attorney & politician, 2017 Republican candidate for Attorney General of Virginia
 Chris LaCivita – political consultant
 Aimee Mann  – 1976-1977 Attended. Graduated from Open High School,  singer/songwriter, member of rock group 'Til Tuesday, as well as a solo career. Til Tuesday broke out in the top 50 with "Voices Carry" in 1985.
 Lucas Pope – Video game developer of Papers, Please
 Dan Richards – Independent professional wrestler nicknamed "The Progressive Liberal" whose controversial pro-Hillary Clinton/anti-Donald Trump gimmick has been reported on by Sports Illustrated, The Washington Post, Rolling Stone, Deadspin, Huffington Post, and Mashable, among other mainstream media outlets

References

External links
 MHS Official Page
 Midlothian High School Band
 Midlothian High School Art

Public high schools in Virginia
Chesterfield County Public Schools
1984 establishments in Virginia